Highway: Rodando la Aventura is a series of Disney Channel Latin America. It is the fourth original production of Disney Channel Latin America, after Zapping Zone, Disney Planet and Art Attack, Disney and the second original mini-series, after Disney Planet. It stars the presenters of Zapping Zone.

The leading couple in this series is the star of Disney Channel, Roger Gonzalez and Valeria Baroni who left the reality High School Musical: La selección.

Synopsis 
Highway: Rodando la Aventura tells the story of a group of eight friends who travel in a motorhome around Latin America to attend the return concert of "WhiteHats", their favorite band, but on the way they form their own band.

Release 
Paulina Holguin confirmed via Facebook that September 5, 2010 would be the launch of the trailer for the series before and after the premiere of Camp Rock 2: The Final Jam.

Its premiere was on 26 October 2010.

Characters

Starring 
 Roger González - Roger: He's the heartthrob of the guys, he can play guitar very well, he realizes he feels love for Vale.
 Valeria Baroni - Vale: She's the nicest of the group and has a very good voice next to Pau, and falls for Roger.
 Walter Bruno - Walter: All the guys ask for favors which can not say no and have a great voice. He is in love with Pau.
 Miguel González - Migue: He is an actor and is always practicing monologues and, sometimes only makes drama.
 María Clara Alonso - Clari: She's neat for all the guys, but during the trip to realize that within it there is only a girl of good manners.
 Dani Martins - Dani: He is constantly devouring the food of the guys, and is the athlete of the group. Gosta de Pau
 Paulina Holguín - Pau: She is the organic group, who cares about animals. Walter likes and a little Danny.
 Vanessa Andreu - Vane: She is the diva actress, thinks she's a Hollywood actress, who sometimes seems bad but, in reality, is a funny girl.

Guest characters 
 Esteban Prol - Richard: Valeria's father. he is smart, funny, strict, and he adores his daughter, likes sarcasm, is a man with a word most of the time. Attracted to Mona.
 Santiago Stieben - Various: Called the joker who will go through several characters which the guys asked, "What was not you who ...?" and he will always answer "No".
 Jorge Blanco - Diego: He is the backpacker and a friend of Vale. Roger and Walter were jealous because he captures the attention of girls.

Episodes

Soundtrack

Tours

Curiosities 
 The song "La Voz" is a song of the miniseries, but then became the official song of Friends for Change 2011.

External links
 Paulina Holguin on Facebook
 Official Fan Club on Twitter
 Roger Gonzalez on Twitter
 Valeria Baroni on Twitter
 Miguel Gonzalez on Twitter
 Maria Clara Alonso on Twitter
 Daniel Martins on Twitter
 Paulina Holguin on Twitter
 Vanessa Andreu on Twitter

Disney Channel (Latin American TV channel) original programming
Argentine comedy television series
2010 Argentine television series debuts
2010s Argentine television series
Spanish-language Disney Channel original programming